Late Bloomers is a 2006 Swiss film directed by Bettina Oberli with Stephanie Glaser. It was Switzerland's submission to the 80th Academy Awards for the Academy Award for Best Foreign Language Film, but was not accepted as a nominee. The film was nominated for Best Foreign-Language Film at the 8th AARP Movies for Grownups Awards, but lost to The Edge of Heaven.

See also

Cinema of Switzerland
List of submissions to the 80th Academy Awards for Best Foreign Language Film

References

External links

Die Herbstzeitlosen at the Swiss Film Directory

2006 films
Swiss German-language films
2006 comedy films
Swiss comedy films
2000s German-language films